Susan Margaret Knight (23 March 1942 – 29 May 2009) was an Australian diver who competed in the 1960 Summer Olympics and in the 1964 Summer Olympics.

References

1942 births
2009 deaths
Divers from Sydney
Australian female divers
Commonwealth Games bronze medallists for Australia
Commonwealth Games gold medallists for Australia
Divers at the 1960 Summer Olympics
Divers at the 1962 British Empire and Commonwealth Games
Divers at the 1964 Summer Olympics
Divers at the 1966 British Empire and Commonwealth Games
Olympic divers of Australia
Commonwealth Games medallists in diving
Medallists at the 1962 British Empire and Commonwealth Games
Medallists at the 1966 British Empire and Commonwealth Games